Koboldocossus is a monotypic moth genus in the family Cossidae. Its only species, Koboldocossus nigrostriatus, is found in Tanzania.

References

Natural History Museum Lepidoptera generic names catalog

Cossinae
Monotypic moth genera
Moths of Africa
Moths described in 2011